Emil Dimitrov (December 23, 1940 in Pleven – March 30, 2005 in Sofia) was a Bulgarian singer, musician and composer. He was popular for his songs "Ако си дал" ('If you have given'), "Моя страна, моя България" ('My country, my Bulgaria'), "Нашият сигнал" ('Our signal'), "Само един живот" ('Only one lifetime'), "Джулия" ('Julia'), "Арлекино" ('Arlequine'), "Писмо до мама" ('Letter to my mother') and others.

In 1970 he was signed to the French record company EMI Pathé-Marconi, which released his first French-language single "L'amour c'est toi". His song Monica (known in Bulgarian as "Моя страна, моя България" ('My country, my Bulgaria') sold out with a circulation of over 500,000 copies in Germany and 100,000 copies in Belgium.

According to the American magazine Billboard Emil Dimitrov has sold over 40 million copies of his albums in the countries in Eastern Europe and the USSR.

Discography 
Bulgarian Evergreens
 Моя страна, моя България (My country, my Bulgaria) – Emil Dimitrov; Director: Stilian Ivanov

Само един живот не е достатъчен (Only one life is not enough)
 Ако си дал... (If you have given something...) – Emil Dimitrov
 Писмо до мама (A letter to my mother) – Emil Dimitrov
 Само тази нощ (Only tonight) – Lili Ivanova
 Само един живот (Only one life) – Iordanka Hristova
 Сбогом, Мария (Good-Bye Maria) – Panaiot Panaiotov

References

External links 
 Official site

1940 births
2005 deaths
Bulgarian pop singers
20th-century Bulgarian male singers
Bulgarian male stage actors
Burials at Central Sofia Cemetery
Musicians from Pleven
Bisexual musicians
Bisexual male actors
Bulgarian LGBT musicians
Traditional pop music singers
20th-century LGBT people
21st-century LGBT people